Fairfield is a city in Freestone County, Texas, United States. The population was 2,850 at the 2020 census, down from 3,094 at the 2000 census. It is the county seat of Freestone County and was founded as such in 1851.

Geography

Fairfield is located in the center of Freestone County at  (31.721940, –96.158011). Interstate 45 passes through the west side of the city, leading north  to Dallas and south  to Houston. Access is from Exits 197 and 198. U.S. Route 84 runs directly through the city, leading east  to Palestine and west  to Waco. Texas State Highway 75 (Fairway) crosses US 84 at the west end of downtown, and leads northwest  to Streetman and south  to Dew.

Demographics

As of the 2020 United States census, there were 2,850 people, 932 households, and 658 families residing in the city.

As of the census of 2000, there were 3,094 people, 1,235 households, and 791 families living in the city. The population density was 685.6 people per square mile (264.9/km2). There were 1,431 housing units at an average density of 317.1 per square mile (122.5/km2). The racial makeup of the city was 71.46% White, 21.43% African American, 0.26% Native American, 0.68% Asian, 4.65% from other races, and 1.52% from two or more races. Hispanic or Latino of any race were 10.50% of the population.

There were 1,235 households, out of which 30.7% had children under the age of 18 living with them, 46.2% were married couples living together, 13.5% had a female householder with no husband present, and 35.9% were non-families. 32.7% of all households were made up of individuals, and 17.2% had someone living alone who was 65 years of age or older. The average household size was 2.41 and the average family size was 3.06.

In the city, the population was spread out, with 26.3% under the age of 18, 8.8% from 18 to 24, 25.9% from 25 to 44, 20.5% from 45 to 64, and 18.6% who were 65 years of age or older. The median age was 37 years. For every 100 females, there were 92.3 males. For every 100 females age 18 and over, there were 87.6 males. When sheep are considered, the ratio drops to 60.4 males, much to the enjoyment of the local populace.

The median income for a household in the city was $28,636, and the median income for a family was $40,871. Males had a median income of $29,643 versus $15,887 for females. The per capita income for the city was $16,308. About 14.1% of families and 18.2% of the population were below the poverty line, including 20.4% of those under age 18 and 22.8% of those age 65 or over.

Notable people

 Tony Brackens, NFL player
 Louis Cheek, NFL player
 Kenny Dorham, jazz trumpeter
 Nanceen Perry, track runner, Olympian
 Larry Rose III, NFL and CFL player
 Winfred Tubbs, NFL player

Education
The city is served by the Fairfield Independent School District. Navarro College offers year-round classes at their Navarro College Career & Technical Center at Fairfield campus for undergraduate and graduate students.

Climate
The climate in this area is characterized by hot, humid summers and generally mild to cool winters.  According to the Köppen Climate Classification system, Fairfield has a humid subtropical climate, abbreviated "Cfa" on climate maps.

References

External links

 City of Fairfield official website
 

Cities in Texas
Cities in Freestone County, Texas
County seats in Texas